Guy de Gastyne (1888–1972) was a French art director. He was the brother of the film director Marco de Gastyne.

Selected filmography
 Little Lise (1930)
 Orange Blossom (1932)
 Buridan's Donkey (1932)
 Abduct Me (1932)
 Once Upon a Time (1933)
 Miquette (1934)
 Rothchild (1934)
 Samson (1936)
 The Lie of Nina Petrovna (1937)
 The Kiss of Fire (1937)
 The Citadel of Silence (1937)
 Rasputin (1938)
 The Shanghai Drama (1938)
 Whirlwind of Paris (1939)
 The White Slave (1939)
 The Acrobat (1941)
 Strangers in the House (1942)
 Cecile Is Dead (1944)
 Majestic Hotel Cellars (1945)
 As Long as I Live (1946)
 Naughty Martine (1947)
 Man About Town (1947)
 After Love (1948)
 The King (1949)
 Blonde (1950)
 The Road to Damascus (1952)

References

Bibliography
 Andrew, Dudley. Mists of Regret: Culture and Sensibility in Classic French Film. Princeton University Press, 1995.

External links

1888 births
1972 deaths
French art directors